Haley Smith (born 22 November 1993) is a Canadian racing cyclist. She competed in the women's cross-country event at the 2018 Commonwealth Games, winning the bronze medal. In July 2021, Smith was named in Canada's 2020 Olympic team.

References

External links
 

1993 births
Living people
Canadian female cyclists
Cyclists at the 2018 Commonwealth Games
Commonwealth Games bronze medallists for Canada
Commonwealth Games medallists in cycling
Cyclists at the 2020 Summer Olympics
Olympic cyclists of Canada
Sportspeople from Markham, Ontario
Medallists at the 2018 Commonwealth Games